The Fain House is an historic mansion in Jefferson City, Tennessee in Jefferson County, Tennessee, United States.  Originally the property of the Fain family, founding members of Mossy Creek, the mansion is now owned by Carson-Newman University and is known as the Honors Campus House.

The Fain Family
Not much of the Fain family's early history in Mossy Creek is known, but it is apparent that a substantial portion of the family lived there prior to the Civil War.  During the Civil War, many of the members of the family served in the Confederate army.  Colonel S.W. Fain, a local hero, returned to take over the cotton spinning factory.  Colonel Richard Gammon Fain was the head of the Tennessee's 63rd Regiment, nicknamed Fain's Regiment, which was a collection of ten companies that fought battles at Drewry's Bluff, Chickamauga, and the Siege of Petersburg.  Fain's Regiment ultimately surrendered after participating in the Appomattox Campaign at Appomattox Court House.  Another notable Fain is Dr. John Fain, living in the late 19th and early 20th century, who served as a physician to many residents of Jefferson City, owned an extensive amount of property, and helped Mayor J.W. Ellis to build a water system for Jefferson City.

The Fain House

Architecture

Notable residents

Legends and Myths

References

Houses in Jefferson County, Tennessee